The 36th Canadian Parliament was in session from September 22, 1997, until October 22, 2000.  The membership was set by the 1997 federal election on June 2, 1997, and it changed only somewhat due to resignations and by-elections until it was dissolved prior to the 2000 election.

It was controlled by a Liberal Party majority under Prime Minister Jean Chrétien and the 26th Canadian Ministry.  The Official Opposition was first the Reform Party, led by Preston Manning, and then its successor party, the Canadian Alliance led by interim leader Deborah Grey.

The Speaker was Gilbert Parent.  See also list of Canadian electoral districts 1996-2003 for a list of the ridings in this parliament.

For the first time in Canadian history, five different parties held official party status.  Although five major parties ran for the 35th Parliament, the Progressive Conservative Party of Canada and the New Democratic Party both failed to win official party status in that parliament.

There were two sessions of the 36th Parliament:

Party standings

The party standings as of the election and as of dissolution were as follows:

Members of the House of Commons

By-elections

References

Succession

 
Canadian parliaments
Jean Chrétien
1997 establishments in Canada
2000 disestablishments in Canada
1997 in Canadian politics
1998 in Canadian politics
1999 in Canadian politics
2000 in Canadian politics